Ocean View High School (OVHS) is a public comprehensive college-prep academy located in Huntington Beach, California. OVHS was established in 1976; their mascot is the Seahawks. Currently, there are approximately 1,470 enrolled students. It is part of the HBUHSD school district, with five other high schools. The school is unique in that it features the only IB Program in the district. The implementation of “embedded tutorial” at the end of each period two years ago resulted in the biggest drop 
in the total number of D and F grades for students in the district. It features a business academy that has 170 participants, the sole Mandarin Chinese foreign language program in the district, and a college preparation curriculum. In addition, the school boasts the highest senior satisfaction survey results of the district. OVHS is also a two-time California Distinguished School.

International Baccalaureate magnet school
OVHS is in the International Baccalaureate or IB program. An IB program consists of three main programs: the IB Primary Years Program (PYP), which is for students ages 3 to 12, the IB Middle Years Program (MYP), ages 11 to 16, and the IB Diploma Program (DP), ages 16 to 19.

Advanced Placement 
Ocean View offers many AP classes in addition to its IB classes. Ocean View High School offers a variety of Advanced Placement courses for students.

School ranking 
In 2008, OVHS was ranked number 775 on the list of top 1,000 high schools in the United States, published by Newsweek Magazine. The public schools are ranked by the number of Advanced Placement or International Baccalaureate test taken by all students in 2007 divided by the number of graduating seniors.

In 2013–2014 it has been ranked #442 in the state and #2018 in the US.

Demographics
The demographics of the student body are as follows:
American Indian/Alaskan Native 2%
Asian 1%
Pacific Islander 0.5%
Filipino 2%
Hispanic/Latino 68%
African American 1%
White 17%
Other/Declined to state 0.3%

Sports 
Ocean View's sports teams are members of the Golden West League in CIF Southern Section. The sports offered at OVHS are marching band, cross-country, track & field, golf, swimming, basketball, wrestling, volleyball, football, soccer, tennis, water polo, and softball.

The 1976 Football team had an inaugural season of 8–1, losing to Bolsa Grande 13–7 to miss out on the League Title. In 1977 they beat Bolsa Grande in a rematch 14–7, capturing the league title and to this day, boasts the only perfect season in Seahawks history. The Seahawks did capture a Sunset League Football Title in 1989, but the joy was short-lived. OV from Sept 1991 until Nov 1994 lost 26 consecutive Football games, an Orange County record. OV has qualified for CIF in 2001 and 2008.

OVHS's first Boys' CIF Title came in 1992 in soccer, finishing with a record of 24–4–3.  The head coach was Paul Kollar, or better known as Senor Kollar, teaching Spanish Levels 1–4 at the time.  Kollar coached at OV for 15 years, winning 204 games, helping lead to 13 CIF playoff berths; semi-final apps in 1984, 1993, and the Div IV-A Championship in 1992.

In 1992, the girls' cross country team, led by Coach Beth Chilcott, won the Division II CIF State Title.

In 1997, the girls' volleyball team won California Div III State Championship; def. El Molina (of Forestwood, Northern California) at Cypress College.  Senior Amy Knebel was recognized as the Div III State Playoffs MVP.
Boys Volleyball has reached Semi Finals in CIF in 2012 & 2019

OVHS is also known for a strong softball program, producing US Olympian Lovie Jung. The 1985 girls went an amazing 32–0 to capture the school's first CIF title. In 2008, the girls defeated Bishop Amat in the Div IV CIF Title game, finishing that season at 29–2, the only HBUHSD to win any CIF title in the 2007–2008 academic year.

Basketball

Jim Harris was the boys' basketball coach from the school's founding until his death in 2011. During the 33-year time span under Harris, his teams won 19 league championships and three CIF Southern Section titles, and a 665–265 record.

The 1998 team is considered one of the best teams in OC High School history.  Preseason Ranking #1 coming off a 1997 22–7 season, the 1998 team held the #1 pre-season county ranking all season and finished Div III-AA Champions (defeating Barstow at the Arrowhead Pond of Anaheim) with a 26–5 record. Led by Tony Dow, CIF III-AA Player of the Year, and their center Kevin Hanson, who is the current player development coach for the NBA's New Orleans Pelicans.  Hanson has also been an assistant coach with the San Antonio Spurs. Notable league victories were defeating Tustin 54–19 and Santa Ana 68–23, both the lowest point totals in those respective schools' history. OV lost in the regional semi-finals of the state tourney to Washington Union and their superstar Chris Jefferies (1st Round; 27th Pick by LA Lakers in 2002).

The 2008–2009 boys' basketball team were regional CIF Champions for Division IV, and advanced to the state finals, where they lost to Sacred Heart Cathedral 62–55. OV was led by Anthony Brown (Lakers) and shooting Guard Avery Johnson (UC Davis).

Cross Country

After 33 years, Boys Varsity Cross Country finally reclaimed the title of League Champions of the Golden West League in 2016. A year later, they won League Champions again in 2017 season.

For the very first time in school history, the Boys Varsity team advanced to CIF State Finals. Top runner Edwin Montes (‘19) placed 13th both at both CIF Finals and State Championship, and has set school records in the 1600m and 800m.

Daniel Hurtado, coach of Boy’s Varsity, was awarded DailyPilot’s Coach of the Year in both 2016 and 2017.

Enrique Najera, head coach of the Cross Country program, received HBUHSD’s Rookie of the Year in 2016. He has been a huge factor in the revival and success of the school’s running program.

Micayla Shook, team captain of Girls’ Varsity Cross Country, was awarded Maxpreps athlete of the month September 2017 for outstanding dedication in both sports and academics. The award was presented by Kyle Clemens, USA Indoor 400m 2014 Champion, and Christina Manning, USA 100m Hurdles Specialist.

Music 
The Seahawk Squadron (Band and Color Guard) won 1st place in the SCJA State Band Championships for division 1 in 2010, 2011, 2012, 2017, and 2019.

Notable alumni
Michael Arrington, TechCrunch founder
Anthony Brown (born 1992), NBA basketball player formerly for the Minnesota Timberwolves, and currently in the Israeli Basketball Premier League
Alex Burnett, professional MLB player, Chicago Cubs
The Rev, former drummer of Avenged Sevenfold
Wayne Carlander, former basketball player at USC
Justin Brunette, baseball player at San Diego State, MLB Cardinals
Carmindy, professional make-up artist on TLC's What Not to Wear
Paul Frank Sunich, of Paul Frank Industries
Synyster Gates, lead guitarist of Avenged Sevenfold
Jason Lee, actor
Paul McGinnis, puppeteer for Sesame Street
Marshall Rohner, Guitarist T.S.O.L., The Cruzados 
Kim Saiki, professional golfer on the LPGA tour
Rusty Smith, Olympic speed skater
Samoa Joe, professional wrestler
Jim Usevitch, former basketball player for BYU, the CBA, and European Professional Leagues.
Byron Velvick, champion bass fisherman and appeared as TV's "Bachelor"
Vince Walker, lead vocals of the Orange County based ska band Suburban Legends
Geoff Zanelli, Emmy Award-winning film composer

References

External links 
Ocean View High School Homepage

Buildings and structures in Huntington Beach, California
Education in Huntington Beach, California
High schools in Orange County, California
International Baccalaureate schools in California
Educational institutions established in 1976
Public high schools in California
Magnet schools in California
1976 establishments in California